David B. Eskind (1909–1992) was a radio scriptwriter and producer for the United States Army.

Early life
Eskind was born in Nashville, Tennessee in 1909. His parents owned theatres in Nashville, and he grew up playing the saxophone. He graduated from the University of Chicago in 1934, where he studied writing with Thornton Wilder.

Career
Eskind wrote radio scripts for Author's Playhouse on NBC and The Buddy Clark Treat Time Show on CBS.

During World War II, he joined the United States Army and worked as a writer-producer of Army radio programs in education and information in the Pacific.

By the end of the war, he was hired by the Armed Forces Radio Service in Washington, D.C., and he became a civilian writer-producer of radio shows. In 1953, he was chief writer of the “Army Hour,” a program broadcast on the Mutual Broadcasting Network, which he also produced.

Death
Esking died of cancer on August 23, 1992 in Washington, D.C.

References

1909 births
1992 deaths
People from Nashville, Tennessee
People from Washington, D.C.
University of Chicago alumni
American radio producers
American Forces Network
United States Army personnel of World War II